Crouse is an unincorporated community and census-designated place (CDP) in Lincoln County, North Carolina, United States. It was first listed as a CDP in the 2020 census with a population of 322. Crouse has a post office with ZIP code 28033.

Transportation
The community's main freeway is NC-150 which one portion of the freeway bypasses its former street route known as "Old NC 150." Other non freeway roads include St. Mark's Church Road which intersects NC-279 and Pleasant Grove Church Road.

Demographics

2020 census

Note: the US Census treats Hispanic/Latino as an ethnic category. This table excludes Latinos from the racial categories and assigns them to a separate category. Hispanics/Latinos can be of any race.

References

Unincorporated communities in Lincoln County, North Carolina
Unincorporated communities in North Carolina
Census-designated places in Lincoln County, North Carolina
Census-designated places in North Carolina